Petros Marinakis (born 16 December 1968) is a Greek retired footballer.

During a 13-year career, Marinakis made over 300 league appearances, scoring more than 40 goals, in the Greek top division. He spent two seasons playing for Olympiacos in the Greek Super League. Marinakis also had a brief spell in Spanish football with Sevilla, but he did not figure in manager José Antonio Camacho's plans and left after just six months with the club.

Marinakis made three appearances for the full Greece national football team from 1991 to 1992, scoring a goal in a Euro 1992 qualifier against Malta.

References

External links

Living people
1968 births
Expatriate footballers in Spain
Greek expatriate footballers
Footballers from Heraklion
Greek footballers
OFI Crete F.C. players
Olympiacos F.C. players
Sevilla FC players
Ethnikos Asteras F.C. players
Greece international footballers
Association football defenders